The Medicine Bow Formation is a geological formation in Wyoming, United States, whose strata date back to the Late Cretaceous. Dinosaur remains are among the fossils that have been recovered from the formation.

See also

 List of dinosaur-bearing rock formations

References

Geologic formations of Wyoming
Cretaceous geology of Wyoming
Maastrichtian Stage of North America